Kierland Commons is a lifestyle center  in Phoenix, Arizona, adjacent to Scottsdale, Arizona which is used for the center's mailing addresses. The mixed-use development is centered on a "Main Street" feel and composed mostly of outdoor retail shops with residential units above and adjoining residential tower.

Development
The mixed-use destination began construction in 1995 and was completed in 2000. The primary developer was Woodbine Development Corporation of Dallas. The development concept, urban design plan and design guidelines were prepared by Design Workshop, Inc. (Denver, CO) and Communication Arts, Inc. (Boulder, CO). Building design was developed and prepared by Nelsen Architects (now known as Nelsen Partners). Originally owned by Westcor, in 2002 Kierland Commons became part of The Macerich Company's portfolio.  Signature Properties was the Exclusive Residential Broker for The Plaza Lofts at Kierland Commons from 2003 through 2013 and remains On-Site to handle resales.

Kierland Commons was one of 10 developments honored as award winners by the Urban Land Institute's (ULI) 2009 Awards for Excellence; the 2009 winners were selected from a pool of 140 projects located across the Americas. The awards are widely considered the land-use industry's most prestigious recognition program. Other awards Kierland Commons has received include the 2010 "Crescordia" Award for Environmental Excellence by the Phoenix Valley Forward Association and the 2004 Honor Award given by the Arizona Chapter of the American Society of Landscape Architects (ASLA).

Kierland Commons was the first lifestyle center in Arizona. The  Main-Street-style development includes shopping, dining, entertainment, office space and upscale loft condominiums, The Plaza Lofts. Kierland Commons was created to serve as the community gathering place for the  master-planned community of Kierland, whose notable features include The Westin Kierland Resort & Spa, the 27-hole Kierland Golf Club, as well as other residential and commercial entities.

Like many shopping centers in the Phoenix area, it is managed by the Westcor division of Macerich, though majority ownership is held by the developer, Woodbine Development Corporation.

Some notable retailers at Kierland Commons include Anthropologie, Banana Republic, BCBG Max Azria, Coach, Crate & Barrel, ECCO, Eileen Fisher, J.Crew, Lucky Brand Jeans, Michael Kors, 7 for all mankind and Tommy Bahama. On December 31, 2014, Barnes and Noble closed.

The Plaza Lofts
The mixed-use development's residential component is composed of The Plaza Lofts at Kierland Commons, located above retail overlooking the central plaza on Main Street and in an adjacent nine-story tower. The Plaza Lofts holds the record for the highest price per square foot of any residential project in Arizona – at $1,051 per square foot on a sale made in February 2007.  Signature Properties was the Exclusive Residential Broker for The Plaza Lofts at Kierland Commons from 2003 through 2013 and remains On-Site to handle resales.

The Scottsdale condominium community features 84 residences in two phases. Phase I was completed spring 2005, with all 30 lofts selling out in 30 days with only on-site signage and word-of-mouth.

Phase II of The Plaza Lofts was completed summer 2008.

Community amenities of The Plaza Lofts include a private residential parking garage; two reception lobbies with card-access entry (one per phase); a professional-grade fitness facility; two community rooms, one with a full kitchen and another with a catering-friendly setup; a heated lap pool and whirlpool; as well as a bi-level outdoor amenity deck featuring fire pits, gas barbecues and comfortable seating areas and a water feature.

See also
 Phoenix metropolitan area
 Scottsdale Fashion Square

References

External links
 
 The Plaza Lofts at Kierland Commons
 Signature Properties, representing The Plaza Lofts at Kierland Commons

Shopping malls in Arizona
Macerich
Lifestyle centers (retail)
Residential buildings in Phoenix, Arizona
Shopping malls in Maricopa County, Arizona
Shopping malls established in 2000